Panas (Opanas) Vasylyovych Fedenko (born 1893, Veseli Terny (today part of Kryvyi Rih), d. 1981 in Munich) was a Ukrainian politician and historian.

Bibliography
 Fedenko, P. Marxist and Bolshevist theories on national matters. "Institute for the Study of the USSR". Munich 1960.
 Fedenko, P. Isaak Mazepa is a fighter for freedom of Ukraine. "Nashe Slovo" Publishing. London 1954.

References

1893 births
1981 deaths
Politicians from Kryvyi Rih
People from Khersonsky Uyezd
Ukrainian people in the Russian Empire
Ukrainian Social Democratic Labour Party politicians
Central Council of Ukraine
Members of the Executive of the Labour and Socialist International